Dashli ada, Ignat Dash or Kamen Ignatiya is an island in the Caspian Sea. It is one of the islands of Baku Archipelago located in the Bay of Baku, 74 km to the south of Baku. Dashli ada is part of the Baku Archipelago, which consists of the following islands: Boyuk Zira, Dash Zira, Qum Island, Zenbil, Sangi-Mugan, Chikil, Qara Su, Khara Zira, Gil and a few smaller ones. The island is located 32.2 km east of Cape Bandovan. The closest island to Dashly - Adsiz Ada - is 13.9 km to the north. The island is of volcanic origin and has a mud volcano.

Discovery 
The island was discovered during Russo-Persian War (1722–1723), the island was named St. Ignatius Rock on a map drawn by the Russians. The island was named after Ignatius of Antioch because it was explored on his feast day.

Volcanic eruptions 
On July 4, 2021, at 21:51, an 8-minute long strong volcanic eruption from the mud volcano was recorded on the island. The blaze was observed in the form of a red light in the sky off the coast from Azerbaijan, including from the capital Baku, which is 74 km to the north. The flames towered 500 meters into the air. The last previous volcanic eruption on the island was recorded in 1945 and the preceding one in 1920.

References 

Islands of Azerbaijan
Islands of the Caspian Sea
Mud volcanoes of Azerbaijan